Chryseobacterium ureilyticum  is a Gram-negative, rod-shaped, non-spore-forming and non-motile bacteria from the genus of Chryseobacterium which has been isolated from a steel surface of a beer bottling plant in Germany.

References

Further reading

External links
Type strain of Chryseobacterium ureilyticum at BacDive -  the Bacterial Diversity Metadatabase

ureilyticum
Bacteria described in 2008